The Āhole Hōlua Complex is a hōlua slide located on Āhole Inlet on the southwest side of the island of Hawaii. The slide was used in the Native Hawaiian sport of hōlua, in which upper-class men raced toboggans down lava slides covered in slippery grasses. Stone platforms along the side of the slide allowed spectators to watch the races. The slide consists of a  slope and a  runway; the slope and length of the slide indicate that the Native Hawaiians had developed advanced engineering skills. The slide is among the best-preserved hōlua slides in Hawaii.

The slide was added to the National Register of Historic Places on November 26, 1973.

References

History of Hawaii (island)
Historic districts on the National Register of Historic Places in Hawaii
Native Hawaiian culture
National Register of Historic Places in Hawaii County, Hawaii